Penn alumni are the (a) founders of a number of colleges, as well as eight medical schools including New York University Medical School and Vanderbilt University School of Medicine, and (b) current or past presidents of over one hundred (100) universities and colleges including Harvard University, University of Pennsylvania, Princeton University, Cornell University, University of California system, University of Texas system, Carnegie Mellon University, Northwestern University, Bowdoin College and Williams College.

Founders and leaders of academic institutions

Law professors and other legal academics 
Khaled Abou El Fadl, professor of law at UCLA School of Law; scholar of Islamic law, immigration, human rights, international and national security law, clerked for Arizona Supreme Court Justice James Moeller, previously taught Islamic law at the University of Texas School of Law at Austin, Yale Law School and Princeton University
Azizah Y. al-Hibri, Professor of Law, Emerita, at T.C. Williams School of Law, University of Richmond; founding editor of Hypatia: A Journal of Feminist Philosophy; founder and president of KARAMAH: Muslim Women Lawyers for Human Rights; a Fulbright scholar who is a member of the advisory board of various organizations, including the Pew Forum on Religion in Public Life, the Pluralism Project Harvard University, and Religion & Ethics Newsweekly (PBS); appointed by President Barack Obama to serve as a commissioner on the U.S. Commission on International Religious Freedom
Anthony G. Amsterdam, University of Pennsylvania School of Law Class of 1960,  Professor of Law at NYU Law School,  served as Editor-in-Chief of the University of Pennsylvania Law Review
Loftus Becker, University of Pennsylvania School of Law Class of 1969, where he served as editor-in-chief of the University of Pennsylvania Law Review,
Bernard Wolfman (1924-2011), Dean of the University of Pennsylvania Law School and its Gemmill Professor of Tax Law and Tax Policy, Fessenden Professor of Law Emeritus at Harvard Law School
 Michael Yelnosky, Class of 1987, Dean, Roger Williams University School of Law, the law school of Roger Williams University

Other college educators and scholars

Other educators

References

Lists of people by university or college in Pennsylvania

Philadelphia-related lists